Festa del Santissimo Salvatore a Pazzano ("Feast of the Holiest Saviour") is a three-day Catholic festival celebrated in Pazzano, Reggio Calabria, Italy, every first weekend after 5 August. 
It was originally the Byzantine celebration of the transfiguration of Christ, still observed today by both the Catholic and Orthodox churches on 6 August.

It is divided in a civil and religious program.
Starting nine days before the feast, Novena (Calabrian novina) is celebrated, consisting of the adoration of the Saviour's statue and the recitation prayers for nine days. Novena is preceded by a litany.

History 

The current wooden statue used in the celebration was created in 1797 by Serrese sculptor Vincenzo Scrivo, discovered thanks to a restoration made in the 1980s. In 2006, another little restoration was made, and that year the feast began at the border with Stilo at Via Nazionale.

Pazzano-Australian emigrants to Sydney (Australia) in Narrawena suburb celebrate Santissimo Salvatore with a similar statue of John the Apostle.

Program

Friday

Saturday

Sunday

Meaning 

The religious procession relives three periods of Jesus' life.

 The first is the transfiguration of Christ upon Mount Tabor, symbolized by the path from the little chapel to the Calvary going through Parrera Street, whose name is of Greek origin, meaning: "steep climb".
 The second is the cumprunta or cunfrunti ("confrontation") of Sunday morning, when Saint Joseph and Mary meet Jesus coming back from the temple to learn from the masters.
 The third it is the cumprunta of Sunday afternoon, when Jesus greets his parents and begins his predication, symbolized by a circuitous route through the streets and alleys of the town.

Litany 
Litany played and sung at Pazzano

Below, a piece of the litany, sung in Latin and played by a band:

Works 

The documentary Festa, by Giuseppe Fiorenza, tells and describes the feast of 1992.

Gallery

Videos

References

See also 
 Pazzano

Vallata dello Stilaro
Calabrian culture
Calabrian folklore
Articles containing video clips